The Wilkes County Regiment was authorized on December 9, 1777 by the Province of North Carolina Congress at the same time that Wilkes County, North Carolina was created from Surry County, North Carolina and Washington District, North Carolina.  The regiment was subordinate to the Salisbury District Brigade of militia.  It was engaged in battles and skirmishes against the British and Cherokee during the American Revolution in North Carolina, South Carolina, Tennessee, and Georgia between 1779 and 1782.  It was active until the end of the war.

Officers
The colonels and commanders of the regiment were:
 Col. Benjamin Cleveland (commander, 1777-1782)
 Col. Elijah Isaacs (2nd colonel, 1779-1783)
 Col. Benjamin Herndon (2nd colonel, 1781-1783)

Known Lieutenant Colonels and Majors:
 Lt. Col. Hardgrove
 Lt. Col. John Herndon
 Lt. Col. William Nash
 Lt. Col. William Shepherd
 1st Maj. John Brevard
 2nd Maj. William Lewis
 Maj. Josiah Branham
 Maj. Jesse Hardin Franklin (later Governor of North Carolina, 1820-1821)
 Maj. Nathaniel Gordon
 Maj. Joseph Hardin Sr.
 Maj. Francis Hargrove
 Maj. Benjamin Herndon
 Maj. Joseph Herndon
 Maj. Elijah Isaacs
 Maj. William Lenoir
 Maj. Joseph Lewis
 Maj. James Smith
 Maj. James Stevenson

The regiment had 78 known companies headed by captains.  Companies consisted of lieutenants, ensigns, sergeants, corporals, privates, drummers and fifers.  Notables captains and other troops included:
 Capt Richard Allen (1778-1781, may have been Colonel of the regiment after the war
 Private John Hammond under Captain Larkin Cleveland (the 2nd to last Revolutionary War Patriot to die, 1760-1868)
 Captain and Major William Lenoir later went on to become a major general in the North Carolina militia after the war.

See also
 List of American Revolutionary War battles
 Salisbury District Brigade
 Southern Campaigns: Pension Transactions for a description of the transcription effort by Will Graves
 Southern theater of the American Revolutionary War

References

Bibliography
 
 

North Carolina militia
Wilkes County, North Carolina